Cyphokentia is a genus of flowering plant in the palm family endemic to New Caledonia.  the genus is named from two Greek words meaning "tumor" and "Kentia", a former palm genus, and the species name translates to "large" and "spike", describing the inflorescence. The genus has two known species and Its closest relative is Clinosperma, also endemic to New Caledonia,. and sole other genus of subtribe Clinospermatinae.

List of species
Cyphokentia cerifera 
Cyphokentia macrostachya

References

External links

 Cyphokentia on NPGS/GRIN
 GBIF Portal]
 Fairchild Guide to Palms: Cyphokentia
 PACSOA: Cyphokentia macrostachya
 Kew Plant List
 IPNI Listing

Clinospermatinae
Arecaceae genera
Endemic flora of New Caledonia
Taxa named by Adolphe-Théodore Brongniart